Blücher may refer to:

People
Blücher (surname)
Gebhard Leberecht von Blücher (1742–1819), Prussian field marshal who led the Prussians at the Battle of Waterloo

Arts and entertainment
Blücher (film), a 1988 Norwegian film 
Frau Blücher, a character in the 1974 film Young Frankenstein
"Blücher", a song by power metal band Kamelot from their 2007 album Ghost Opera
Blücher, a hand in the British card game Napoleon

Military
Operation Blücher, one World War I and two World War II German army operations
Blücher Order, an East German decoration named after Field Marshal Blücher
Wolf pack Blücher, a German U-boat pack of World War II
List of ships named Blucher, which includes warships (as well as civilian vessels)

Places
Blucher, Saskatchewan, Canada, an unincorporated community
Rural Municipality of Blucher No. 343, Saskatchewan
Blucher, Newcastle, a small district of Newcastle upon Tyne, England
Blucher Creek, California, United States

Transport
List of ships named Blucher
Blücher (locomotive), an early railway locomotive

Shoes
Derby shoe, called a blucher in American English, whose laces tie over the tongue on two flaps
Blucher shoe, a shoe with open lacing, similar to the derby, but with vamp in one piece

Other uses
Blucher (horse) (died 1841), a British Thoroughbred racehorse
Blücher, a boarding house at Wellington College, Berkshire, England
Blücher, a manufacturer of stainless steel drainage systems

See also
Blüchern, a gambling game that Field Marshal Blücher was said to have played